Jan Jozef van Deemter (31 March 1918 – 10 October 2004) was a Dutch physicist and engineer known for the Van Deemter equation in chromatography.

He obtained his doctorate in physics from the University of Amsterdam in June of 1950. Starting in 1947 he began work for Royal Dutch Shell as a researcher and it was there that he developed and published his article in 1956.

Van Deemter equation
The van Deemter equation relates the resolving power of a chromatographic column to the various flow and kinetic parameters which cause peak broadening through

Where HETP is the height equivalent theoretical plate, A is the eddy-diffusion parameter, B is the longitudinal diffusion coefficient of the eluting material in the longitudinal direction, C is the resistance to mass transfer coefficient of the analyte between mobile and stationary phase, and u is the linear velocity of the column flow.

References

1918 births
2004 deaths
20th-century Dutch physicists
People from Kleve
University of Amsterdam alumni
University of Groningen alumni